The Beau Lake (in French: "Le Beau Lac") is a freshwater lake in the north–south axis through the Saint Francis River. The lake is the center of the boundary between:
 Maine (United States): North Maine Woods, Aroostook County, Big Twenty, township T20 R11 & R12 Wels (northern part of the western shore of the lake) and T19 R11 Wels;
 Quebec (Canada): administrative region of Bas-Saint-Laurent, regional county municipality (RCM) Témiscouata Regional County Municipality, in municipality of Rivière-Bleue, Quebec.

This lake is located entirely in the forest zone. In the story, the main economic activity was forestry. Since the mid-twentieth century, the resort and tourist activities have developed. This lake is particularly renowned for fishing and recreational boating in particular because of its mountainous landscape.

On the side of Maine, a forest road runs along the western shore of the lake. While the side of the Quebec, a few dozen homes are served by an access road to the northern half of the lake.

Geography 

The lake is consisting of enlargement of the Saint Francis River. This lake is walled by steep cliffs:

This lake is fed by the discharge of Saint Francis River (Canada–United States) (from the north) and the stream of "Coulée Creuse" (English: Creuse Casting) (from the east). This lake discharges through the South by the continuity of the Saint Francis River.

The mouth of "The Beautiful Lake" is located at the bottom of the southern tip of the lake or at the limit of Quebec and New Brunswick.

Toponym

The place name "Le Beau Lac" was formalized on December 5, 1968, at the Commission de toponymie du Québec (Quebec Geographical Names Board).

See also 
 Aroostook County, a county Maine
 North Maine Woods
 Témiscouata Regional County Municipality (RCM)
 Rivière-Bleue, Quebec, a municipality of Quebec
 Saint Francis River, a stream
 List of lakes of Canada
 List of lakes in Maine

References 

North Maine Woods
Lakes of Aroostook County, Maine
Lakes of Bas-Saint-Laurent
Saint John River (Bay of Fundy)
International lakes of North America